The Philippi Covered Bridge, on the Tygart Valley River, is the main local landmark and historical icon of Philippi, West Virginia, USA.

The celebrated bridge was commissioned by the General Assembly of Virginia and constructed in 1852 by Lemuel Chenoweth, a well-known Appalachian bridge builder, to provide a link on an important segment of the vital Beverly-Fairmont Turnpike between Beverly (Chenoweth's hometown) and Fairmont. The bridge has strong associations with the American Civil War, especially the Battle of Philippi (1861).

The Philippi Covered Bridge is the oldest and longest covered bridge in West Virginia and one of only two remaining in Barbour County. It is also the only covered bridge on the United States Numbered Highway System (as part of U.S. Route 250). It was placed on the National Register of Historic Places in 1972.

History

Bidding, design and construction
The circumstances of the bidding on the contract for the bridges in western Virginia are given by Hu Maxwell:

Bidders were present [at Richmond] in large numbers from the East and the North, with all sorts of models and plans, including iron structures, wire cables, cantilevers, stone arches, and wooden bridges of many kinds. Mr. Chenoweth was there with his model made of hickory wood, as strong as it could possibly be made, not to exceed the required size. So far as appearances went, some of the New England Yankees had models of perfect form and beauty, painted and enameled in the highest art. On the appointed day, the bidders all assembled before the Board of Public Works, and each showed his model, and set forth his claims of what weight his bridge would sustain. Mr. Chenoweth was one of the last called forward to show what he had. His plain wooden model did not attract much attention; but he created consternation among the other bidders when he placed his model on two chairs, one end resting on each, and then stood on his little bridge, and called on the other architects to put theirs to the test by doing the same. Not one would do it, for they knew their models would be crushed. If the Philippi bridge were as strong in proportion to its size as Mr. Chenoweth's model, it would sustain the weight of a man six hundred feet high. The test decided the contest, and Mr Chenoweth was given the contract for the bridges.

The bridge design incorporates the "Long" Burr Arch Truss and was built for $12,180.68. It is one of few surviving "double-barreled" (two lane) covered bridges in the United States.

Civil War
The bridge was used on 3 June 1861 by both Union and Confederate troops after the Battle of Philippi, by some reckonings the first land battle of the American Civil War. The bridge was the first to be captured in the war by either side and was used for a time as a barracks by the victorious Union troops.

The bridge narrowly escaped burning in April and May 1863 at the time of the Confederate raids on the B&O Railroad west of Cumberland, Maryland. Orders were issued by General William E. Jones for the burning of it and of the covered bridge at Rowlesburg, but the intercession of several locals of Southern sympathies (especially Elder Joshua S. Corder) saved both.

Structural modifications
The bridge has undergone a number of renovations after being severely damaged at least seven times over the years.

In 1934, increased motorized traffic mandated the addition of two concrete piers to the bridge's substructure (for a total of five) along with a new steel reinforced concrete deck (to replace the old wooden one) and an external walkway to better accommodate pedestrian traffic.

The bridge was damaged by a severe flood on 4–5 November 1985 and was virtually destroyed by fire on 2 February 1989. A gasoline tanker truck refilling underground tanks at a nearby filling station overfilled a tank, spilling gasoline which ran down into the bridge. A car passing through the bridge then sparked a fire when its exhaust system backfired. The bridge was then closed to traffic until a $1.4 million reconstruction was completed and the bridge reopened on 16 September 1991. The reconstruction, under the direction of the bridge historian and West Virginia University professor Emory Kemp, included replacing the damaged yellow poplar supports. Care was taken to  restore the exterior to its original appearance: the rounded double arch entrances were restored, red-painted shingles (also of poplar) were affixed to the roof and new external wooden siding was replaced in a horizontal orientation.

Today, the original, burnt wooden trusses and supports can still be seen when driving through the bridge.

Folklore
A local legend once asserted that US President Abraham Lincoln and Confederate President Jefferson Davis were witnessed by a small boy meeting secretly in the bridge late in the course of the American Civil War to discuss peace terms.

See also
List of West Virginia covered bridges
Barrackville Covered Bridge, also designed by Chenoweth
National Register of Historic Places listings in West Virginia

References

External links

"The Covered Bridge at Philippi" at the Appalachian Blacksmiths Association website

American Civil War sites in West Virginia
Barbour County, West Virginia in the American Civil War
Bridges completed in 1852
Western Virginia campaign
Covered bridges on the National Register of Historic Places in West Virginia
Buildings and structures in Barbour County, West Virginia
National Register of Historic Places in Barbour County, West Virginia
Transportation in Barbour County, West Virginia
Tourist attractions in Barbour County, West Virginia
Wooden bridges in West Virginia
Conflict sites on the National Register of Historic Places in West Virginia
U.S. Route 250
1852 establishments in Virginia
Road bridges on the National Register of Historic Places in West Virginia
Burr Truss bridges in the United States